Ó Fiaich was the surname of a Gaelic-Irish erenagh and Brehon family from County Fermanagh. The Ó Fiaich family were of the Cenél nEógain. It is anglicized as  Fee, Fye, Fay, and Foy.

 Diarmait O Fiaich, abbot of Recles Gilla Molaise Ui Gillaurain, from Tuaim, rested in Christ and was buried at Ardcarne, 1229
 Tomás Ó Fiaich, 1923–1990, Archbishop of Armagh

References
 http://www.irishtimes.com/ancestor/surname/index.cfm?fuseaction=Go.&UserID=
 http://www.cregganhistory.co.uk/ofiaichcentre/arms.htm-
 http://www.libraryireland.com/names/of/o-fiaich.php

Surnames
Irish families
Irish Brehon families
Surnames of Irish origin
Irish-language surnames
Families of Irish ancestry